Deschutes County is one of the 36 counties in the U.S. state of Oregon. As of the 2020 census, the population was 198,253. The county seat is Bend. The county was created in 1916 out of part of Crook County and was named for the Deschutes River, which itself was named by French-Canadian trappers of the early 19th century. It is the political and economic hub of Central Oregon. Deschutes comprises the Bend, Oregon Metropolitan Statistical Area. Deschutes is Oregon’s fastest-growing and most recently-formed county.

History
French-Canadian fur trappers of the Hudson's Bay Company gave the name  (River of the Falls) to the Deschutes River, from which the county derived its name.

On December 13, 1916, Deschutes County was created from the southern part of Crook County. Bend has been the county seat since the county's formation. It was the last county in Oregon to be established.

The Shevlin-Hixon Lumber Company also operated within the Bend area processing Ponderosa pine trees.

Geography

Adjacent counties
 Linn County (northwest)
 Jefferson County (north)
 Crook County (east)
 Harney County (southeast)
 Lake County (south)
 Klamath County (south)
 Lane County (west)

National protected areas
 Deschutes National Forest (part)
 Newberry National Volcanic Monument

Demographics

2000 census
As of the census of 2000, there were 115,367 people, 45,595 households, and 31,962 families living in the county.  The population density was 38 people per square mile (15/km2).  There were 54,583 housing units at an average density of 18 per square mile (7/km2).  The racial makeup of the county was 94.85% White, 0.19% Black or African American, 0.83% Native American, 0.74% Asian, 0.07% Pacific Islander, 1.36% from other races, and 1.96% from two or more races.  3.73% of the population were Hispanic or Latino of any race. 19.4% were of German, 13.2% English, 11.4% Irish and 9.1% American ancestry.

There were 45,595 households, out of which 32.10% had children under the age of 18 living with them, 58.00% were married couples living together, 8.50% had a female householder with no husband present, and 29.90% were non-families. 22.00% of all households were made up of individuals, and 7.70% had someone living alone who was 65 years of age or older.  The average household size was 2.50 and the average family size was 2.91.

In the county, the population was spread out, with 24.80% under the age of 18, 7.80% from 18 to 24, 28.60% from 25 to 44, 25.70% from 45 to 64, and 13.10% who were 65 years of age or older.  The median age was 38 years. For every 100 females there were 98.70 males.  For every 100 females age 18 and over, there were 97.00 males.

The median income for a household in the county was $41,847, and the median income for a family was $48,403. Males had a median income of $34,070 versus $25,069 for females. The per capita income for the county was $21,767.  About 6.30% of families and 9.30% of the population were below the poverty line, including 10.40% of those under age 18 and 6.10% of those age 65 or over.

2010 census
As of the 2010 census, there were 157,733 people, 64,090 households, and 43,062 families living in the county. The racial makeup of the county was 92.2% white, 0.9% Asian, 0.9% American Indian, 0.4% black or African American, 0.1% Pacific islander, 3.0% from other races, and 2.5% from two or more races. Those of Hispanic or Latino origin made up 7.4% of the population. In terms of ancestry, 24.0% were German, 15.3% were Irish, 14.5% were English, and 4.8% were American.

Of the 64,090 households, 30.8% had children under the age of 18 living with them, 53.4% were married couples living together, 9.4% had a female householder with no husband present, 32.8% were non-families, and 24.1% of all households were made up of individuals. The average household size was 2.44 and the average family size was 2.88. The median age was 40.2 years.

The median income for a household in the county was $53,071 and the median income for a family was $61,605. Males had a median income of $43,543 versus $33,207 for females. The per capita income for the county was $27,920. About 7.6% of families and 10.5% of the population were below the poverty line, including 14.9% of those under age 18 and 7.7% of those age 65 or over.

Communities

Cities
Bend (county seat)
La Pine
Redmond
Sisters

Census-designated places

 Black Butte Ranch
 Deschutes River Woods
 Eagle Crest
Pronghorn
 Seventh Mountain
 Sunriver
 Terrebonne
 Three Rivers
Tetherow
 Tumalo

Unincorporated communities

Alfalfa
Brothers
Cloverdale
Deschutes
Elk Lake
Hampton
Millican
Plainview
Prineville Junction
Shevlin

Politics
While Deschutes County has traditionally fallen politically more in line with the eastern side of Oregon than the western side, this has shifted in recent years, due in large part to the rapid growth and urbanization within the city of Bend. By January 2021, a narrow plurality of registered voters in Deschutes County were registered with the Democratic Party. In addition, Joe Biden carried the county with 52.7% of the vote in the 2020 Presidential Election (compared 44.4% of the vote for Donald Trump), marking the first time a Democratic Party candidate won the county since 1992 and the first time a Democratic Party candidate received a majority of the vote in the county since 1964.

In 2008, the Oregon House seat encompassing the city of Bend switched parties and hosted the only Democratic state legislator from a district east of the Cascades, though the Republicans retook the seat in 2010.  Republicans would hold the seat for the remainder of the decade until 2020, when Democrat Jason Kropf was elected to the State House and re-elected in 2022. In 2022, the 53rd District, including Redmond, elected Democrat Emerson Levy to the Oregon House.

Economy

During the 1990s, Deschutes County experienced the most rapid growth of any county in Oregon, largely due to the year-round availability of recreational activities, and its location as the nearest population center to much of the central Cascade Range. Beyond tourism, principal industries in the county are lumber, ranching and agriculture—chiefly potatoes. The Forest Service owns 51% of the lands within the county boundaries.

Deschutes County is the home of four destination resorts as defined by Oregon's Department of Land Conservation and Development.  These resorts are major employers within the county.  Three of these resorts, Sunriver, Eagle Crest, and Pronghorn, are among the county's ten largest tax payers.

Geology
The overall defining landscape of Deschutes County is primarily marked with that of lava flows. Most of the lava found in Deschutes County issued forth from Newberry Volcano located just south of Bend. Because of this, many lava tubes are located within, including the prominent Lava River Cave. As a consequence, the county is the most cave-rich in the state of Oregon, with over 500 known caves in the county. Other prominent lava flows exist too, especially those related to the Mount Bachelor Volcanic Chain which consists of Mount Bachelor as well as three smaller shield volcanos, and a series of cinder cones.

Large volcanoes serve as a backdrop to the city of Bend in Deschutes County, ranging from the prominent Three Sisters, Mount Washington, Mount Bachelor, Broken Top, Newberry, Tumalo Mountain, Maiden Peak and others. A group of geologists have discovered Smith Rock State Park is part of an ancient supervolcano called the Crooked River caldera with a rim nearly six times the diameter of Newberry Volcano's caldera. This ancient supervolcano has long gone extinct. Its crater rim is barely recognizable as remnants mark portions of Powell Buttes, Gray Butte, and the western front of the Ochoco Mountains at Barnes Butte.

On the eastern side of the county, it is mostly characterized by large buttes of much older volcanic origin. Most of these did not create any proper lava flows, or at least none that are known to exist. Some of the prominent buttes include Horse Ridge, Pine Mountain, China Hat, and several others on the county border.

Two main types of lava flows are found within the county. The most common are the pāhoehoe flows which have been partially buried by volcanic ash, tephra deposits, and dirt over tens to hundreds of thousands of years. The aā flows are fewer but much more prominent, with the most notable being associated with Lava Butte and the Lava Cast Forest in the Newberry National Volcanic Monument.

See also
National Register of Historic Places listings in Deschutes County, Oregon

References

Further reading
 

 
1916 establishments in Oregon